Halil Rifat Pasha (Modern Turkish: Halil Rıfat Paşa; 1820–9 November 1901) was an Ottoman parliamentarian and statesman during the First Constitutional Era. He furthermore served as the Grand Vizier for six years between 1895 until his death in 1901, during the late Abdul Hamid II era.

Education 
He was born in Serres (Serez) and received education in an Islamic type parish school in Salonika (Selanik), then continued to Mekteb-i Mülkiye in Constantinople.

Life and career 
After his education years, he started to work as a mailing clerk in Vidin, then worked as secretary in the office of the Governor of Salonika. He advanced by degrees and was appointed to higher official positions by passage of time, including at Rustchuk. In 1882 he was appointed as mutasarrıf of Vidin, then in 1886 he was appointed as governor of Sivas, where he started a road-building programme. He was subsequently appointed governor of Aidin (1889) and later of Monastir, where he fought brigandage units which was rife in the province. He was appointed as minister of internal affairs in 1893. Then he was appointed as grand vizier in November 1895. The most important events in his era as grand vizier were the riots of Sason (in 1895) and in Crete (in 1897), as well as the Greco-Turkish War of 1897 which ended with Ottoman victory.

Trivia
His motto in the road building campaign was "Any place where you can't go is not yours"

Notes and references

See also
 List of Ottoman Grand Viziers
 Hamidian massacres

External links
Abdulhamid II Era
Halil Rifat Pasha as the minister of internal affairs
An educational website that contains information about Halil Rifat Pasha
 Halil Rifat Paşa (biography in Turkish in pdf format - abstract also in English) Sivas Cumhuriyet University

1820 births
1901 deaths
19th-century Grand Viziers of the Ottoman Empire
20th-century Grand Viziers of the Ottoman Empire
Ottoman governors of Aidin
Ottoman people of the Greco-Turkish War (1897)
Pashas
Politicians from Thessaloniki
Macedonian Turks